Mariví Simó Marco is a retired Spanish football defender, who played for Levante UD all her entire career.

In July 2016, Mariví received a homage by her one-club career.

Titles
 1 league: 2008
 1 national cup: 2007

References

1983 births
Living people
Spanish women's footballers
Primera División (women) players
Levante UD Femenino players
Women's association football defenders